Norman Hunter may refer to:
 Norman Hunter (author) (1899–1995), English children's author
 N. C. Hunter (Norman Charles Hunter, 1908–1971), British playwright 
 Norman Hunter (speedway rider) (born 1940), English motorcycle speedway rider
 Norman Hunter (footballer) (1943–2020), English international footballer